JA Moore is an American politician. He is a member of the South Carolina House of Representatives from the 15th District, serving since 2018. He is a member of the Democratic Party.

Political career 
Moore is 1st Vice Chair of the Interstate Cooperation Committee, and a member of Medical, Military, Public and Municipal Affairs Committee. In February 2020, he endorsed Democrat Pete Buttigieg for the Presidency of the United States.

In August 2020, Moore endorsed Senator Kamala Harris for Vice President, and Jaime Harrison for the U.S. Senate.

Electoral history

2018 South Carolina House of Representatives
Moore was the only Democrat to run in 2018, so there was no Democratic primary.

2020 South Carolina House of Representatives
Both candidates advanced unopposed to the general election. This contest is a rematch of the District 15 House of Representatives race from 2018.

Personal life
Moore was born in Orangeburg and currently resides in Hanahan. He attended Johnson & Wales University, graduating with a culinary arts degree. He married Victoria Rae in March 2016.

References

Living people
Democratic Party members of the South Carolina House of Representatives
African-American people in South Carolina politics
21st-century American politicians
Johnson & Wales University alumni
Year of birth missing (living people)
21st-century African-American politicians
People from Orangeburg, South Carolina